Alfrēds Rubiks (Alfred Petrovich Rubiks; born 24 September 1935, in Daugavpils), is a Latvian communist politician and a former leader of the Communist Party of Latvia. He was a Member of the European Parliament for Latvia from 2009 until 2014. In the European Parliament he was a member of the European United Left–Nordic Green Left group.

Due to his former allegiance with the Communist Party of Latvia after January 1991, Rubiks is prohibited from running for an electable office in Latvia under Latvian law. His two sons Artūrs Rubiks and Raimonds Rubiks are also politicians and members of the Saeima for Harmony.

Biography 

Rubiks served as the Chairman of the city of Riga from 1984 to 1990, effectively the last Communist mayor of the city. He was a member of the Politburo of the Communist Party of the Soviet Union from July 1990 until the party was banned on November 6, 1991. As head of the Communist Party of Latvia in 1991 he opposed Latvia's independence from the Soviet Union and issued a list of Latvian pro-independence politicians to be arrested but on 23 August 1991 was imprisoned himself for his role in attempting to overthrow the then new democratic government and supporting the August 1991 coup d'état attempt in Moscow. Despite his incarceration, Rubiks was nominated as a candidate in the 1996 Latvian presidential election by the Socialist Party, but lost to incumbent Guntis Ulmanis. Rubiks was released in November 1997 for good behaviour, and became chairman of the Socialist Party of Latvia, the de facto successor to the Communist Party, in 1999. In a 2000 poll, Rubiks was ranked the least popular politician in Latvia with a score of -22.4 points.

He was elected a Member of the European Parliament in the 2009 European Parliament elections as one of the two reprentatives of the political alliance Harmony Centre. In 2012, Rubiks distributed his biography "From Political Prisoner to European Parliament Member" to all EP members, drawing criticism from other MEPs from Latvia for the claims made in the book. In 2015, after the Socialist Party of Latvia lost in the 2014 European Parliament election, he resigned as its chairman. In 2019, along with Nils Ušakovs he was removed from the board of Harmony Centre.

References

1935 births
Living people
Politicians from Daugavpils
Heads of the Communist Party of Latvia
Politburo of the Central Committee of the Communist Party of the Soviet Union members
Socialist Party of Latvia politicians
People's commissars and ministers of the Latvian Soviet Socialist Republic
Members of the Congress of People's Deputies of the Soviet Union
Members of the Supreme Soviet of the Latvian Soviet Socialist Republic, 1980–1985
Members of the Supreme Soviet of the Latvian Soviet Socialist Republic, 1985–1990
Deputies of the Supreme Council of the Republic of Latvia
Deputies of the 5th Saeima
Mayors of Riga
Candidates for President of Latvia
Harmony Centre MEPs
MEPs for Latvia 2009–2014
People of the Singing Revolution
Riga Technical University alumni
Latvian prisoners and detainees
Prisoners and detainees of Latvia